Warren Derek May (born 31 December 1964) is a former English footballer who played as a defender.

Career
May began his career at hometown club Southend United, after playing for the club at youth level. In three years as a professional at the club, May made 99 appearances in all competitions for Southend, scoring four times. In 1986, May signed for Maidstone United. Following a spell at Maidstone, May played for Barking, Chelmsford City, Chesham United and Harrow Borough.

References

1964 births
Living people
Association football defenders
English footballers
Sportspeople from Southend-on-Sea
Southend United F.C. players
Maidstone United F.C. (1897) players
Barking F.C. players
Chelmsford City F.C. players
Chesham United F.C. players
Harrow Borough F.C. players
English Football League players